Bolesław I the Brave High School in Piotrków Trybunalski (I Liceum Ogólnokształcące im. Bolesława Chrobrego w Piotrkowie Trybunalskim) - a high school in Piotrków Trybunalski. The school continues the tradition of two conventual schools organized by Piarists (1675) and Jesuits (1716).

Students
Jan Stanisław Jankowski - politician
Stanisław Konarski - educational reformer
Zdzisław Najder - writer, chief of the Polish-language section of Radio Free Europe/Radio Liberty
Marceli Nencki - chemist
Józef Pawlikowski
Henryk Struve - philosopher
Józef Życiński - Roman Catholic bishop

References

External links
Official page

1675 establishments in the Polish–Lithuanian Commonwealth
Buildings and structures in Piotrków Trybunalski
Educational institutions established in the 1670s
High schools in Poland